Selkirk Yard is a large freight railroad yard located in Selkirk, New York, about  south of Albany. The yard is owned by CSX Transportation and is its major classification yard for the northeastern United States and the gateway to points east of the Hudson River, including New York City. It is situated just west of the Alfred H. Smith Memorial Bridge on the railroad's Castleton Subdivision, and is the eastern end of the Selkirk Subdivision.

History

Selkirk Yard was built in 1924 by the New York Central Railroad on a  site. Initially, it had two hump classification yards with a capacity of 11,000 cars and typically handled 8,000 cars per day.

1968 rebuild

It features a 70-track classification hump yard, several support yards and servicing facilities. The yard can process over 3,200 cars per day, using computerized controls that originally employed a GE PAC 4020.

Recent improvements
Improvements in 2011 included an automobile transload facility and a genset switching locomotive, to improve air quality by reducing emissions from yard operations.

Since 2017, Selkirk features a two-track mainline that runs east to west on the south side of the yard, allowing many run-through trains to swap crews more quickly and easily. Before, these trains ran through the body of the yard.

See also
List of rail yards
Selkirk hurdle

References

External links
Photos of Selkirk Yard from the Conrail era
Selkirk track diagrams and related maps

CSX Transportation
Rail yards in New York (state)
New York Central Railroad
Transportation buildings and structures in Albany County, New York
1924 establishments in New York (state)